Cherbuliez is a French-language family name.

The surname may refer to:

 Antoine-Elisée Cherbuliez (1798–1869), Swiss liberal thinker
 Victor Cherbuliez (1829–1899), French novelist and author
 Marie Tourte-Cherbuliez (1793–1863), Swiss writer, translator and literary critic 

French-language surnames